Wake Up Everybody may refer to:
 Wake Up Everybody (Harold Melvin & the Blue Notes album)
 "Wake Up Everybody" (Harold Melvin & the Blue Notes song)
 Wake Up Everybody (2004 album), a compilation album released to coincide with the U.S. 2004 presidential election
 "Wake Up Everybody" (R. Kelly song)